Lukhovitsky District is an administrative and municipal district (raion), one of the thirty-six in Moscow Oblast, Russia. It is located in the southeast of the oblast. Its administrative center is the town of Lukhovitsy. Population: 58,802 (2010 Census);  The population of Lukhovitsy accounts for 50.8% of the district's total population.

References

Notes

Sources

Districts of Moscow Oblast